Centre Hospitalo-Universitair Mustapha Pacha (French: Centre Hospitalo-Universitaire Mustapha d'Alge) was founded in 1854 in the town of Moustapha (now Sidi M'Hamed) and is the largest hospital in Algeria.

This hospital center is one of 14 Centre Hospitalo-Universitair under the Algerian Ministry of Health, Population and Hospital Reform.

History

The hospital was established by a legacy of a rich settler named Fortin, a native of Ivry, in the city of Algiers. In his will of 19 September 1840, he donated a sum of 1.2 million francs for the erection of a civilian hospital in Mustapha.

At its inception in 1854, it was a military hospital with a barracks on 8 hectares. On 21 May 1855, the civilian doctors courses were open to students, and on 18 January 1859, official courses were inaugurated in the framework of the new School of Medicine of Algiers founded in 1857.

After 1877, 14 pavilions were built to plans by the architect Jules Voinot. The first services were those of Pediatrics in 1883 and obstetrics in 1884. It was decided in 1920 to expand the hospital. The number of pavilions was doubled by 1930. There has been continual expansion since then.

Namesake

Mustapha Pacha,  Mustapha VI ben Brahim Pasha (Arabic  :  مصطفى بن ابراهيم باشا ), or Mustafa ben Brahim (English) was dey of Algiers between May 1798 and the August 31, 1805, date of his assassination by a Janissary..

Services
The hospital provides the following services:

Renowned professors and students
 Jean Baptiste Paulin Trolard (1869), anatomist 
 Jules Aimé Battandier (1876), botanist 
 Louis Charles Trabut (1880), doctor and botanist 
 Omar Boudjellab (1970), cardiologist
 Tedjini Haddam (1970), thoracic surgeon

References

Hospitals in Algeria
Teaching hospitals
Buildings and structures in Algiers Province
University of Algiers
1854 establishments in Africa
1850s establishments in Algeria
1854 establishments in the French colonial empire
Hospital buildings completed in 1854
19th-century architecture in Algeria